The Inner Rothorn is a mountain of the Swiss Pennine Alps, overlooking Saas-Balen in the canton of Valais. It lies on the ridge descending from the Fletschhorn, which ends at the Jegihorn.

References

Mountains of the Alps
Alpine three-thousanders
Mountains of Valais
Mountains of Switzerland